Lypothora is a genus of moths belonging to the family Tortricidae.

Species
Lypothora fernaldii Butler, 1883
Lypothora roseochraon Razowski & Wojtusiak, 2010
Lypothora walsinghamii Butler, 1883

References

 , 2005: World Catalogue of Insects volume 5 Tortricidae.
 , 2010: Some Tortricidae from the East Cordillera in Ecuador reared from larvae in Yanayacu Biological Station in Ecuador (Insecta: Lepidoptera). Genus 21 (4): 585-603. Full article: .

External links
tortricidae.com

Polyorthini
Tortricidae genera
Taxa named by Józef Razowski